Ekseption was a Dutch rock band active from 1967 to 1989, playing mostly-instrumental progressive rock and classical rock. The central character in the changing roster, and the only band member present on every album, was conservatory-trained trumpeter Rein van den Broek (10 September 1945 - 11 May 2015).  The band saw some commercial success in the 1970s, having Dutch top ten hit singles with their adaptations of Beethoven's "Fifth" and Bach's "Air". The second album, Beggar Julia's Time Trip (1969), won the Dutch Edison Award for album of the year, and the first five albums all went gold.

History
Ekseption grew out of the high-school band The Jokers, which van den Broek formed in 1958.  They changed their name to The Incrowd (after the Ramsey Lewis song) before discovering that name was already taken.  Finally they settled on the name Ekseption in 1967. The group played jazz, pop and R&B covers, but in 1969, shortly after keyboardist Rick van der Linden joined, they were impressed by a gig of The Nice, and van der Linden decided to concentrate on producing classical rock, modern re-interpretations of classical works for rock band.  Most of their subsequent albums contain both original songs and re-interpreted classical pieces.

It quickly became evident that van der Linden had assumed leadership of the group, and in a 1972 press release interview accompanying advance copies of the album Ekseption 5 he openly said so.  After 1973's Trinity album he was asked to leave the group by his bandmates, and in the fall of that year he formed a new group Trace, during which time he was replaced by Dutch keyboardist Hans Jansen.  Jansen took Ekseption in a jazzier direction, with two LPs of original compositions, but lackluster sales caused the band to break up in 1976. An offshoot band, named Spin, formed later that year and released two more albums, but success also eluded them.  In 1978 Trace and Spin merged to become Ekseption once again. Periodic reunions (with new members) appeared until van der Linden's death in 2006.

Personnel

 Rein van den Broek - trumpet, flugelhorn (1967-1989)
 Rick van der Linden - keyboards (1969–1973, 1978–1981)
 Cor Dekker - bass guitar (1969–1975)
 Peter de Leeuwe - drums, vocal (1969, 1971–1972)
 Rob Kruisman - saxophones, flute, vocal (1969)
 Huib van Kampen - solo guitar, tenor sax (1969)
 Dennis Whitbread (also Withbread - real name Dennis Witbraad) - drums (1970)
 Dick Remelink - saxophones, flutes (1970–1972)
 Michel van Dijk - vocals (1970) (later of Alquin)
 Linda van Dyck - vocals (1970)
 Erik van Lier - trombone, tuba (1970)
 Tony Vos - saxophones, production (1969–1971)
 Steve Allet (real name Koen Merkelbach) - vocals (1970)
 Jan Vennik - saxophones, flute (1973–1979)
 Pieter Voogt - drums (1973–1975)
 Hans Jansen (full name Johannes J. Jansen) - keyboards <small>(1974–1977)
 Hans Hollestelle - guitar (1974–1976)

 Max Werner - drums (1981)
 Johan Slager - bass, guitar (1981)
 Jan Hollestelle - bass, synthesizers, cello (1976)
 Frans Muys van de Moer - bass (1989–1993)
 Cees Kranenburg - drums, percussion (1976)
 Inez van der Linden - vocals (2003)
 Mark Inneo - drums (2003)
 Bob Shields - guitar (2003)
 Meredith Nelson - bass guitar (2003)
 Peter Tong - keyboards (2003)

Spin (1976-1977)
 Rein van den Broek - trumpet
 Jan Vennik - sax, flute
 Hans Jansen - keyboards
 Hans Hollestelle - guitar
 Kees Kranenburg - drums
 Jan Hollestelle - bass

Discography

Note: Back to the Classics is the only Ekseption album which does not list personnel.  Instead the liner notes say, "The pieces were recorded by musicians who were with EKSEPTION between 1969 and 1975, joined by Holland's best session musicians to replace those members who had to be excluded because of contractual obligations".  Since this record was recorded during the time when all the principal members were involved with either Trace or Spin, the only Ekseption members appearing must have been backing musicians.

Compilations, live albums, reunion albums
 Ekseptional Classics - the Best of Ekseption (1973)
 Ekseption Witte Album
 Motive
 Greatest Hits - Classics (1975)
 Best of Ekseption
 Classic in Pop
 Pop Lions
 Reflection (1976)
 Ekseption Live at Idssteiner Schloss (1978)
 Past and Present (1983)
 Ekseption Plays Bach (1989)
 Greatest Hits (1990)
 With Love From Ekseption (1993)
 The 5th: Greatest Hits (1998)
 The Reunion (1994, live)
 Selected Ekseption (1999)
 With a smile (2000)
 Air (2001)
 The Best from Classics (2001)
 The Best of Ekseption (2002)
 The Universal Master Collection (2003)
 Live in Germany (2003)
 3 Originals (2004)
 Rick van der Linden: An Ekseptional Trace (2007)
 The Last Live Concert Tapes (2009)
 Hollands Glorie (2009)

Videography
 The Story of Ekseption (DVD, PAL format, 2010)

References

External links

Semi-official website
General information

Dutch rock music groups
Dutch progressive rock groups
Musical groups established in 1967
Musical groups disestablished in 1989